Matagorda Island, Spanish for "thick bush," is a 38-mile (61 km) long barrier island on the Texas Gulf coast, located approximately  south of Port O'Connor, in the southernmost part of Calhoun County. The traditional homeland of the Karankawa people, the island is oriented generally northeast-southwest, with the Gulf of Mexico on the east and south, and Espiritu Santo Bay on the west and north. It is separated from San José Island to the south by Cedar Bayou, and is separated from the Matagorda Peninsula to the north by Pass Cavallo. It is accessible by boat only.

Matagorda Island State Park occupies  on the northeastern end of the island.  The remainder of the island is devoted to wildlife refuges managed by the Texas Parks and Wildlife Department and the United States Fish and Wildlife Service and is known as Matagorda Island National Wildlife Refuge and State Natural Area.

The land that is now Matagorda Island State park was acquired in 1940 by condemnation from the Hawes, Hill, and Little families (but not the Wynne-Murchison interests) for use as a temporary training facility for the World War II era.

Matagorda Island State Park was featured as a "survival location" by the main characters in the book Day by Day Armageddon by J.L. Bourne.  The island is also featured as a principal location in the book Powersat by Ben Bova.  Life on the island in the late 1800s is described in the book  A Texas cowboy, or, Fifteen years on the hurricane deck of a Spanish pony by Charles A. Siringo

Climate
The climate in this area is characterized by hot, humid summers and generally mild to cool winters.  According to the Köppen Climate Classification system, Matagorda Island has a humid subtropical climate, abbreviated "Cfa" on climate maps.

See also
Matagorda Island Air Force Base
Matagorda Island Light
Matagorda Peninsula Army Airfield

References
Notes

Sources
Matagorda Island: Block 2201, Census Tract 9905, Calhoun County, Texas United States Census Bureau

External links
Texas Parks and Wildlife: Matagorda Island State Park
Aransas National Wildlife Refuge Complex: Matagorda Island Unit
 
Matagorda Island History
A Texas cowboy, or, Fifteen years on the hurricane deck of a Spanish pony on the Internet Archive
 
 

Barrier islands of Texas
State parks of Texas
Landforms of Calhoun County, Texas
Protected areas of Calhoun County, Texas